Mail Shack Creek is a stream in the U.S. state of South Dakota.

Mail Shack Creek was named for a shelter which stood there which was used by the mail delivery man.

See also
List of rivers of South Dakota

References

Rivers of Sully County, South Dakota
Rivers of South Dakota